Pione Sisto Ifolo Emirmija (born 4 February 1995) is a Danish professional footballer who plays as a left winger for Danish club Midtjylland.

He began his professional career with Midtjylland of the Danish Superliga, making 114 total appearances and scoring 31 goals over five seasons. In 2016 he transferred to Celta Vigo for a €5 million fee, where he scored 18 goals in 135 games. In 2020, he returned to  Midtjylland for €3 million.

Sisto made his senior debut for the Denmark national team in 2015, and was part of their squad for the 2018 FIFA World Cup.

Club career

Early career
Pione Sisto was born in Kampala, Uganda, into a South Sudanese family. Sisto's family moved to Denmark when he was two months old. He was spotted by Tjørring IF in 2002, aged seven, and moved to FC Midtjylland’s youth setup in 2010.

Midtjylland
Sisto made his league debut during the 2012–13 Danish Superliga season and scored his first professional goal during the same season in the match against AGF. On 2 March 2014, he scored twice in FC Midtjylland's 5–1 away victory over Copenhagen in the Danish Superliga.

In December 2014, Sisto was voted "Player of the Year 2014" by the Danish Footballers' Association and "Profile of the Autumn 2014" by the Danish Football Magazine.

After an injury he played his first club match in 2015 in May coming on as a substitute against Copenhagen. Shortly after, he made an assist for the game's first goal followed by scoring the deciding goal, securing a 2–0 win for Midtjylland and their first Danish league title.

Scouts from Barcelona, Milan, and Juventus went to Denmark several times to see the Danish midfielder and Arsenal has also shown interest in the midfielder. According to Dutch newspaper De Telegraaf Ajax has offered €7 million without success.

He scored for Midtjylland against Manchester United in a 2–1 home win in the Europa League on 18 February 2016. He also scored the opening goal of the second-leg at Old Trafford before Midtjylland went on to lose 5–1 (6–3 on aggregate) to United and bow out of the Europa League.

Celta

On 31 July 2016, La Liga club Celta de Vigo reached an agreement for the transfer of Sisto, for a fee rumoured to be €5 million. He signed a five-year deal.

He made his debut at the club on 22 August, starting in a 0–1 home loss against CD Leganés. On 25 September he scored for the first time in a 2–0 win at RCD Espanyol, running 80 metres from one penalty area to the other in the final minute. Also in his first season in Galicia, Sisto played 13 games and scored twice as the club reached the semi-finals of the UEFA Europa League for the first time. Both of his goals were in either leg of the 4–3 aggregate win over K.R.C. Genk in the quarter-finals in April 2017.

In May 2020, Sisto was fined a club record €60,000 by Celta for having driven 3,000 kilometres back to Denmark in March, during the COVID-19 pandemic.

Return to Midtjylland
On 7 September 2020, Midtjylland announced that they had signed Sisto on a four-year contract. The fee was reported as 22.5 million Danish krone, or around €3 million. The transfer became official after a lengthy dispute, where he almost joined the club's rivals, FC Copenhagen, whose offer was 4 million krone lower. Commenting on the transfer saga, Sisto stated that "It was my heart. My heart suddenly chose to go to FC Midtjylland. I found that it has always been my wish, but sometimes one gets tested." He also said that he was "a fan of intelligence" and that "there [would] always be pressure when you are Pione," referring to himself in third person. Sisto was assigned the number 7.

International career
Since Sisto was not a Danish citizen but had lived almost his whole life in Denmark, the Danish national team manager Morten Olsen expressed his hope that the player would be eligible for the national squad. Upon receiving his Danish citizenship in December 2014, Sisto was immediately chosen to represent the Denmark national under-21 football team, although in an unofficial match. He was not yet able to represent Denmark in an official international match due to FIFA regulations. On 23 January 2015, he made his debut for the Danish U21 side, scoring a hat-trick in a 7–1 win against Romanian club FC Dinamo București.

On 8 May 2015, Sisto received official word of FIFA's dispensation decision, allowing him to represent Denmark without waiting the obligatory five years following his 18th birthday. Twelve days later, he was called up to the Denmark national football team for its matches against Montenegro and Serbia.

In June 2015, he represented the Denmark U21 team at the 2015 UEFA European Under-21 Championship in the Czech Republic, and scored the last goal in a 2–1 victory against the host nation in the opening match at the Eden Arena in Prague.

Sisto debuted for the Danish national football team on 4 September 2015, in a Euro 2016 qualifying match against Albania. He played the first 45 minutes of the goalless draw before being replaced at halftime by Yussuf Poulsen. He scored his first international goal on 22 March 2018, the only goal of a friendly win over Panama in Copenhagen.

In May 2018, Sisto was named in Denmark's preliminary 35-man squad for the 2018 World Cup in Russia. He was also named in the final 23-man team.

Personal life
After the 2018 FIFA World Cup, Sisto proclaimed himself to be "the most hated person in Denmark" on social media, after having received criticism for his performances. His statements were met with surprise among Danish media.

In May 2019, Sisto confessed on social media that he had been on a 21-day diet consisting of only fruit. He stated that he "lost control" and that the "subsconscious is darkness".

In May 2020, Sisto revealed that he had suffered with bouts of depression which had begun during the 2018 FIFA World Cup. He also stated that he had been subject to racial abuse from parents of teammates during his time at the FC Midtjylland Academy in Ikast.

Career statistics

Club

International
Statistics accurate as of match played 15 November 2021.

Scores and results list Denmark's goal tally first.

Honours
Midtjylland
Danish Superliga: 2014–15
Danish Cup: 2021–22

References

External links

Profile at the FC Midtjylland website

1995 births
Living people
2018 FIFA World Cup players
Association football wingers
Danish expatriate men's footballers
Danish men's footballers
South Sudanese footballers
Naturalised citizens of Denmark
Danish people of South Sudanese descent
Sportspeople from Kampala
Ugandan emigrants to Denmark
South Sudanese emigrants to Denmark
Ugandan footballers
Ugandan people of South Sudanese descent
Denmark youth international footballers
Denmark under-21 international footballers
Denmark international footballers
La Liga players
Danish Superliga players
Tjørring IF players
FC Midtjylland players
RC Celta de Vigo players
Danish expatriate sportspeople in Spain
Sportspeople of South Sudanese descent
Expatriate footballers in Spain